Woippy is a French commune in the Moselle department, Grand Est, located near Metz.

Woippy houses the 6th Régiment du matériel (6e RMAT).

Woippy-Triage is the largest classification yard in France.

Population

See also
 Communes of the Moselle department

References

External links
 

Communes of Moselle (department)